Balaclava is a Northern Village of the Southern Highlands of New South Wales, Australia in Wingecarribee Shire. It is 1 km north-east of Mittagong. The village includes a service station, real estate, pre-school, nursery, doctor's surgery and antiques store. It is located in Wingecarribee Shire and is often considered part of Braemar along with its neighbour Willow Vale.

Population 
According to the 2021 census, there were 574 people living at Balaclava.

References

Towns of the Southern Highlands (New South Wales)